Amer Gojak (born 13 February 1997) is a Bosnian professional footballer who plays as an attacking midfielder for Nemzeti Bajnokság I club Ferencváros and the Bosnia and Herzegovina national team.

Gojak started his professional career at Olimpic, before joining Dinamo Zagreb in 2015. In 2020, he was loaned to Torino.

A former youth international for Bosnia and Herzegovina, Gojak made his senior international debut in 2018, earning over 30 caps since.

Club career

Early career
Gojak started playing football at a local club, before joining youth academy of his hometown club Željezničar in 2009. In January 2014, he moved to Olimpic. He made his professional debut against Velež on 1 March at the age of 17. On 15 March, he scored his first professional goal against Rudar Prijedor, which secured the victory for his team.

Dinamo Zagreb
In May, Gojak was transferred to Croatian side Dinamo Zagreb for an undisclosed fee. He made his official debut for the team in Croatian Cup game against Istra 1961 on 3 March 2015. Three weeks later, he made his league debut against the same opponent. He won his first trophy with the club on 2 May, when they were crowned league champions. On 14 May 2016, he scored his first goal for Dinamo Zagreb in a triumph over Lokomotiva.

Gojak debuted in UEFA Champions League away at Lyon on 14 September.

In March 2017, he extended his contract until June 2022.

He scored four goals in a defeat of Cibalia on 29 April.

Gojak played his 100th game for Dinamo Zagreb against biggest rivals Hajduk Split on 26 May 2019.

On 13 July, he scored the only goal in 2019 Croatian Super Cup match against Rijeka, ensuring the title for his side.

In October 2020, he was loaned to Italian outfit Torino until the end of season.

He made his 200th appearance for Dinamo Zagreb on 15 May 2022 against Šibenik.

International career
Gojak represented Bosnia and Herzegovina at all youth levels.

In March 2017, he received his first senior call-up, for a 2018 FIFA World Cup qualifier against Gibraltar and a friendly game against Albania, but had to wait until 15 November 2018 to make his debut in a 2018–19 UEFA Nations League game against Austria.

On 5 September 2019, in a UEFA Euro 2020 qualifier against Liechtenstein, Gojak scored a brace, his first senior international goals.

Personal life
Gojak married his long-time girlfriend Irma in April 2022.

Career statistics

Club

International

Scores and results list Bosnia and Herzegovina's goal tally first, score column indicates score after each Gojak goal.

Honours
Dinamo Zagreb
Croatian First League: 2014–15, 2015–16, 2017–18, 2018–19, 2019–20, 2021–22
Croatian Cup: 2014–15, 2015–16, 2017–18
Croatian Super Cup: 2019, 2022

References

External links

1997 births
Living people
Footballers from Sarajevo
Bosniaks of Bosnia and Herzegovina
Bosnia and Herzegovina Muslims
Bosnia and Herzegovina footballers
Association football midfielders
Bosnia and Herzegovina international footballers
Bosnia and Herzegovina youth international footballers
Bosnia and Herzegovina under-21 international footballers
Premier League of Bosnia and Herzegovina players
Croatian Football League players
Serie A players
Nemzeti Bajnokság I players
FK Olimpik players
GNK Dinamo Zagreb players
Torino F.C. players
Ferencvárosi TC footballers
Bosnia and Herzegovina expatriate footballers
Bosnia and Herzegovina expatriate sportspeople in Croatia
Expatriate footballers in Croatia
Bosnia and Herzegovina expatriate sportspeople in Italy
Expatriate footballers in Italy
Bosnia and Herzegovina expatriate sportspeople in Hungary
Expatriate footballers in Hungary